Shadow of Terror is a 1945 American thriller film directed by Lew Landers and written by Arthur St. Claire. The film stars Richard Fraser, Grace Albertson, Cy Kendall, Emmett Lynn, Kenneth MacDonald and Eddie Acuff. The film was released on October 5, 1945, by Producers Releasing Corporation.

Plot

Cast      
Richard Fraser as Jim aka Howard Norton
Grace Albertson as Joan Rutledge 
Cy Kendall as Victor Maxwell
Emmett Lynn as Elmer
Kenneth MacDonald as McKenzie
Eddie Acuff as Joe Walters
Sam Flint as Sheriff Dixon

References

External links
 

1945 films
American thriller films
1940s thriller films
Producers Releasing Corporation films
Films directed by Lew Landers
American black-and-white films
Films scored by Karl Hajos
1940s English-language films
1940s American films